The Honor Temples were two structures in Munich, erected by the Nazis in 1935, housing the sarcophagi of the sixteen members of the Party who had been killed in the failed Beer Hall Putsch (the Blutzeugen, "blood witnesses"). On 9 January 1947 the main architectural features of the temples were destroyed by the U.S. Army as part of denazification.

The first memorial
On 8 November 1933 Hitler addressed the party’s old guard at the Bürgerbräukeller (where the putsch had begun) and the next day unveiled a small memorial with a plaque underneath at the east side of the Feldherrnhalle. Two policemen or the SS stood guard on either side of the memorial’s base and passers-by were required to give the Hitler salute.

The memorial could be circumvented, and the salute avoided, by choosing a small nearby side street, which came to be known as Drückebergergasse ("Shirker's Alley").

The inauguration
In 1934 no commemorative march was made on the anniversary because of Hitler’s purge of the SA’s ranks in the Night of the Long Knives. The next year on 8 November the putschists were exhumed from their graves and taken to the Feldherrnhalle, where they were placed beneath sixteen large pylons bearing their names. The next day, after Hitler had solemnly walked past from one to the next, they were taken down the monument’s steps and taken on carts, draped in flags to Paul Ludwig Troost’s new Ehrentempel monuments at the Königsplatz, through streets lined with spectators bustling between 400 columns with eternal flames atop. Flags were lowered as veterans slowly placed the heavy sarcophagi into place. In each of the structures eight of the martyrs were interred in a sarcophagus bearing their name.

The martyrs of the movement were in heavy black sarcophagi in such a way as to be exposed to rain and sun from the open roof. When Gauleiter Adolf Wagner died from a stroke in 1944 he was interred metres away from the north temple in the adjacent grass mound in between the two temples.

Features
At the temples visitors were required to be silent, not wear hats and keep children from running over the centre of the temples. The Ehrentempel was made of limestone except for its roof which was made of steel and concrete with etched glass mosaics. The columns of the structures each extended .

Post-war
On 5 July 1945 the American occupying army removed the bodies from the Ehrentempel and contacted their families. They were given the option of having their loved ones buried in Munich cemeteries in unmarked graves or their family plots or having them cremated, common practice in Germany for unclaimed bodies. The columns of the structures were recycled into brake shoes for municipal buses and new material for art galleries damaged in the war. The sarcophagi were melted down and given to the Munich tram service who used it for soldering material to repair rail and electrical lines damaged by the war.

On 9 January 1947 the upper parts of the structures were blown up. The centre portion was subsequently partially filled in but often filled with rain water which created a natural memorial. When Germany was reunited there were plans made for a biergarten, restaurant or café on the site of the Ehrentempel but these were derailed by the growth of rare biotope vegetation on the site. As a result of this, the temples were spared complete destruction and the foundation bases of the monuments remain, intersecting on the corner of Briennerstrasse and Arcisstrasse. In the intermittent period of the 1947 destruction and 1990 handover, basements (hitherto unknown to the Americans) were uncovered beneath the structures. A small plaque added in 2007 explains their function.

Interments
Felix Alfarth
Andreas Bauriedl
Theodor Casella
William Ehrlich
Martin Faust
Anton Hechenberger
Oskar Körner
Karl Kuhn
Karl Laforce
Kurt Neubauer
Klaus von Pape
Theodor von der Pfordten
Johann Rickmers
Max Erwin von Scheubner-Richter
Lorenz Ritter von Stransky
Adolf Wagner (buried in the grass mound between steps in 1944)
Wilhelm Wolf

See also
 Nazi architecture
 Denazification
 Völkisch movement

References

External links
Munich Documentation Centre for the History of National Socialism

Nazi architecture
1935 establishments in Germany
Historicist architecture in Munich
Beer Hall Putsch
Buildings and structures completed in 1935
Buildings and structures demolished in 1947